The 2016–17 Season was the 110th season in Sevilla Fútbol Club's history, and 16th consecutive season in La Liga. The team competed in La Liga, the Copa del Rey, the Supercopa de España, the UEFA Super Cup and the UEFA Champions League.

Players

Squad information

Transfers

Summer transfers

Winter transfers

Pre-season & friendlies

Competitions

Overall

Overview

UEFA Super Cup
Sevilla secured their spot by winning the 2015–16 UEFA Europa League.

Supercopa de España

La Liga

League table

Matches

Copa del Rey

Matches

Round of 32

Round of 16

UEFA Champions League

Group stage

Knockout phase

Round of 16

Statistics

Appearances and goals

|-
! colspan=16 style=background:#dcdcdc; text-align:center|Goalkeepers

|-
! colspan=16 style=background:#dcdcdc; text-align:center|Defenders

|-
! colspan=16 style=background:#dcdcdc; text-align:center|Midfielders

|-
! colspan=16 style=background:#dcdcdc; text-align:center|Forwards

|-
! colspan=16 style=background:#dcdcdc; text-align:center| Players who have made an appearance this season but have left the club

|}

Goalscorers

References

Sevilla FC seasons
Sevilla
Sevilla